James Francis Norris (born December 20, 1948) is a former professional baseball outfielder. He played in Major League Baseball from 1977 to 1980 for the Cleveland Indians and Texas Rangers, playing all three outfield positions.

Amateur career
Born in Brooklyn, New York, Norris graduated from Seaford High School, and was selected by the Chicago White Sox in the 31st round of the 1967 MLB Draft. Rather than turn professional, he opted to attend the University of Maryland, where he became a three-time All-ACC outfielder. In 1969 and 1970, he played collegiate summer baseball for the Orleans Cardinals of the Cape Cod Baseball League, and was named league MVP in 1969 with a league-leading .415 batting average.

Professional career
He was selected by the Cincinnati Reds in the 2nd round of the 1970 MLB Draft, but did not sign. In the 1971 draft, he was taken in the 5th round by the Cleveland Indians, and broke into the major leagues with the Indians in the 1977 season. He batted .270 with 26 stolen bases in 133 games during his rookie season. Prior to the 1980 season, he was dealt to the Texas Rangers in a multi-player trade. He played one year with the Rangers, and retired after spending the 1981 season with Triple-A Wichita.

Honors
In 2002, he was named to the ACC's 50th anniversary baseball team, and in 2004 he was inducted into the Cape Cod Baseball League Hall of Fame.

References

External links
, or Retrosheet, or Pelota Binaria (Venezuelan Winter League)
 1969 Major League Scouting Bureau scouting report of Jim Norris

1948 births
Living people
Baseball players from New York (state)
Cardenales de Lara players
American expatriate baseball players in Venezuela
Cleveland Indians players
Elmira Pioneers players
Gulf Coast Indians players
Jacksonville Suns players
Major League Baseball outfielders
Maryland Terrapins baseball players
Oklahoma City 89ers players
Orleans Firebirds players
San Antonio Brewers players
Sportspeople from Brooklyn
Baseball players from New York City
Texas Rangers players
Toledo Mud Hens players
Wichita Aeros players